Clarence Alfred Woodward Sherry (4 June 1895 – 19 April 1977) was an Australian rules footballer who played with Fitzroy in the Victorian Football League (VFL).

Sherry was one of Fitzroy's wingmen in their 1922 premiership team and also played in the side which lost the 1923 VFL Grand Final. As he retired after the 1923 premiership decider, and missed most of that year, Sherry had appeared in two grand finals from his last five games.

He was good enough to represent the VFL in interstate football on three occasions during his career.

References

1895 births
1977 deaths
Fitzroy Football Club players
Fitzroy Football Club Premiership players
Australian rules footballers from Victoria (Australia)
One-time VFL/AFL Premiership players